William Nelson Edward Hall  (28 April 1827 – 27 August 1904) was the first Black person, first Nova Scotian, and third Canadian to receive the Victoria Cross. He received the medal for his actions in the 1857 Siege of Lucknow during the Indian Rebellion. During the action in which the naval gun crew with which he was serving came under heavy fire, Hall, and an officer from his ship, continued to load and fire a 24-pounder gun at the walls of the enemy position after the rest of the party had been killed or injured by the defenders.

Early life
William Edward Hall was born at Horton, Nova Scotia, in 1827 as the son of Jacob and Lucy Hall, who had escaped American slave owners in Maryland during the War of 1812 and were brought to freedom in Nova Scotia by the British Royal Navy as part of the Black Refugee movement. The Halls first lived in Summerville, Nova Scotia where Jacob worked in a shipyard operated by Abraham Cunard until they bought a farm across the Avon River at Horton Bluff. Hall first worked in shipyards at nearby Hantsport, Nova Scotia, before going to sea at the age of seventeen. He sailed first on merchant ships based out of the Minas Basin including the barque Kent of Kentville, Nova Scotia.

Naval career

Hall briefly served in the United States Navy from 1847 to 1849, during the Mexican–American War. He served for a time aboard  alongside John Taylor Wood, who later supported Hall's US Navy pension claim.

Hall volunteered for the Royal Navy in February 1852, serving at first aboard . Hall fought in the Crimean War serving ashore in a Naval Brigade from Rodney at the battles of Inkerman and Sevastopol in 1854.

When the Indian Mutiny broke out in May 1857, Shannon was among the fleet escorting a troop detachment to China. Upon arrival at Singapore, news of the situation in India reached the fleet, however the fleet completed its mission, arriving at Hong Kong. There, Shannon was ordered to Calcutta (since renamed Kolkata). A brigade from Shannon, comprising 450 men, was constituted under Captain William Peel. The ship was towed over  up the Ganges River to Allahabad. Then the force fought across country to Campbell's headquarters at Cawnpore and were in time to take part in the Siege of Lucknow.

Relief of Lucknow

On 16 November 1857 at Lucknow, India, naval guns were brought up close to the Shah Nujeff mosque, one of the key locations in the siege. One of the gun crews was short a man and Hall volunteered to fill out the position. The gun crews kept up a steady fire in an attempt to breach and clear the walls, while a hail of musket balls and grenades from the opposing fighters inside the mosque caused heavy casualties. After having little effect on the walls, two guns were ordered closer. The joint citation in the London Gazette reads:

Later career
Hall remained with the Royal Navy for the rest of his career. On 28 October 1859, he was presented with the Victoria Cross by Rear Admiral Charles Talbot while Donegal was anchored at Queenstown Harbour. He returned to his home village in Horton Bluff where he ran a small farm until his death in 1904.
In 1901, the future King George V, visiting Nova Scotia, saw Hall at a parade, recognized his medals, and spoke with him.

Commemorations

He was originally buried in an unmarked grave without military honours. He was reinterred in 1954 in Hantsport, Nova Scotia where his grave is marked by a monument at the Baptist church. The Royal Canadian Legion (now closed) in Hantsport was named "The Lucknow Branch" in honour of his Victoria Cross action.

Hall's original Victoria Cross was repatriated from Britain in 1967 by the government of Nova Scotia and is on permanent display at the Maritime Museum of the Atlantic in Halifax.

Hall is also featured in exhibits at the Halifax Citadel and at the Black Cultural Centre for Nova Scotia. Canada Post commemorated William Hall on a stamp, first issued on 1 February 2010 in Hantsport, Nova Scotia and officially launched at the Black Cultural Centre on 2 February 2010. Hall was designated a National Historic Person by the Canadian Historic Sites and Monuments Board at Hantsport on 8 October 2010 and a new plaque was unveiled in his honour.

In November 2010, a connector road in Hantsport was named the William Hall V.C. Memorial Highway. A sign, bearing Hall's likeness, was erected on the road from Highway 101 to Trunk 1 near Hantsport.

The fourth ship in the Royal Canadian Navy's  will be named after William Hall. The ship keel was laid at Irving Shipbuilding's yard in Halifax in February 2021.

Awards and decorations
Hall's personal awards and decorations include the following:

100px

See also
 Nova Scotia Heritage Day

Notes

Citations

Bibliography

External links
Naval Bombardment of Sebetobol
Film short – William Hall
"William Hall VC", Biography from the Nova Scotia Museum
"William Hall", DaCosta 44
Legion Magazine article on William Hall
Photos of William Hall monument at Hantsport, Nova Scotia

1821 births
1904 deaths
Burials in Canada
Canadian military personnel from Nova Scotia
Black Nova Scotians
Canadian recipients of the Victoria Cross
Indian Rebellion of 1857 recipients of the Victoria Cross
Naval history of Canada
People from Hants County, Nova Scotia
People from Kings County, Nova Scotia
Pre-Confederation Nova Scotia people
Royal Navy sailors
Royal Navy recipients of the Victoria Cross
Royal Navy personnel of the Crimean War
United States Navy sailors
Persons of National Historic Significance (Canada)